Allyson Lawless is a South African structural engineer, businesswoman and an International Fellow of the Royal Academy of Engineering. In the year 2000 she became the first female president of the South African Institution of Civil Engineering (SAICE).

Education 
Lawless holds a Bachelor of Science in Civil Engineering from the University of Natal and a Master of Science, DIC in Structural Engineering from Imperial College, London. She was made an International Fellow of the Royal Academy of Engineering on 5 November 2012.

Contributions 
Lawless created the Computer Aided Design software AllyCAD. AllyCAD is commonly used in her home country of South Africa. She is also the Managing Director of SAICE Professional Developments and Projects, a non-profit company created to address civil engineering skills development in South Africa. She has published two books; Numbers and Needs in 2005, and Numbers and Needs in Local Government in 2007.

References 

South African engineers
Living people
Fellows of the Royal Academy of Engineering
Female Fellows of the Royal Academy of Engineering
21st-century women engineers
Year of birth missing (living people)